Magdaléna Borová (born 14 April 1981 in Frýdlant, Czechoslovakia now Czech Republic) is a Czech actress.

In 2005 she graduated from Academy of Performing Arts in Prague. Afterwards she joined National Theatre in Prague (ND). She appeared in the movie Hrubeš a Mareš jsou kamarádi do deště and in two TV films produced by Česká televize. She received Alfréd Radok Award in category Talent of the Year.

Notable performances 

 2006 – Thomasina Coverly in Arcadia, Czech National Theatre (Národní divadlo)
 2005 – Marcela in The Dog in the Manger by Lope de Vega, Czech National Theatre (Národní divadlo)
 2004 – Helena in All's Well That Ends Well, Klicpera's Theatre (Klicperovo divadlo) in Hradec Králové
 2003 – Daughter in The Shameless by Koffi Kwahulé, DISK

Cinema 
 2020 – Veberová in Shadow Country, Czech film: Krajina ve stínu by Bohdan Sláma)
 2016 – Me, Olga Hepnarová
 2009 – Hrubeš and Mareš reloaded
 2009 – Wifes of my Husband
 2005 – Hrubeš and Mareš are Friends to the Rain
 2005 – Fairy Tale about Violin and Viola (TV film)
 2003 – Maryška (TV film)

Notes

External links
borova.wz.cz Official fansite

1981 births
Living people
Czech stage actresses
Czech film actresses
Academy of Performing Arts in Prague alumni
People from Frýdlant
Czech television actresses
21st-century Czech actresses
Czech Lion Awards winners